Micromelerpeton is an extinct genus of dissorophoidean euskelian temnospondyl within the family Micromelerpetontidae.

References

Further reading
 

Dissorophoids
Fossils of Germany
Prehistoric amphibian genera
Carboniferous temnospondyls of Europe
Permian temnospondyls of Europe
Fossil taxa described in 1926